Anup Raj Sharma was the Chief Justice of Nepal from 11 February 2010 to 25 March 2010. He was preceded by Min Bahadur Rayamajhi and succeeded by Ram Prasad Shrestha. He was appointed chairperson of the National Human Rights Commission (NHRC) in 2014.

References 

Living people
Chief justices of Nepal
Year of birth missing (living people)